Steven Roy Gerber (September 28, 1948, Washington, D. C. – May 28, 2015, New York City) was an American composer of classical music. He attended Haverford College, graduating in 1969 at the age of twenty. He then attended Princeton University with a fellowship to study musical composition.

Biography and career
Steven Gerber's works include the contrapuntal Fantasy for Solo Violin, which has been recorded  on both the CRI and Naxos labels, and Piano Trio, commissioned by the Hans Kindler Foundation.

His composition teachers included Robert Parris, James K. Randall, Earl Kim, and Milton Babbitt.

His early works are in a free atonal style.  During his years as a graduate student, he wrote serial and non-twelve-tone works, such as the a cappella choral works "Dylan Thomas Settings" and "Illuminations" (Rimbaud), and throughout the remainder of the 1970s most of his works were twelve-tone.  Beginning in the early 1980s, he abandoned twelve-tone composition, with rare exceptions, and his music became much more tonal, for example in his Piano Sonata.  Since then his music remained largely tonal, sometimes extremely chromatic, sometimes diatonic.

His music has been reviewed in The New York Times and The Washington Post. His music has been played in the former Soviet Union perhaps more widely than that of any other American composer.

In 2005, the conductor Vladimir Ashkenazy commissioned Gerber to compose an orchestral work.  The resulting six-movement suite, Music in Dark Times, was premiered by Ashkenazy with the San Francisco Symphony Orchestra on March 25–28, 2009. He died in New York City on May 28, 2015, aged 66.

List of compositions

Orchestral
1981 Harmonium: Six Poems of Wallace Stevens, for solo soprano and orchestra
1989 Symphony No. 1
1990 Ode (1st movement of Serenade) for string orchestra
1990 Serenade for string orchestra
1992 Piano Concerto
1992 Dirge and Awakening
1993 Violin Concerto
1994 Cello Concerto
1996 Viola Concerto
1998 Serenade Concertante
1998 Triple Overture for solo violin, cello and piano and orchestra
2000 Spirituals, for string orchestra
2002 Fanfare for the Voice of A-M-E-R-I-C-A
2002 Clarinet Concerto
2004 Symphony No. 2, "Elegies and Fanfares"
2005 Two Lyric Pieces, for solo violin and string orchestra
2005-08 Music in Dark Times

Chamber
1967 Sonata for violin and piano
1967 Woodwind Quartet
1968 Trio for violin, cello and piano
1969 Duo for cello and piano
1969 Duo for violin and cello
1971 String Trio
1972 Nexus, for violin and percussion
1973 String Quartet No. 1
1977 Duo for flute and piano
1978 Dreamwork, for flute, viola, cello, and piano
1979 Duo for viola and piano
1981 String Quartet No. 2
1984 Duo in Three Movements for violin and piano
1984 Concertino for string quartet and piano
1986 Woodwind Quintet
1987 Fantasy Quartet for percussion
1988 String Quartet No. 3
1991 Piano Quintet for string quartet and piano
1995 String Quartet No. 4
1996 Notturno, for violin, cello and piano
1996 (rev. 2006) Five Canonic Duos, for oboe and bassoon
1996 Sonatina for oboe and guitar
1997 Three Pieces for Two Violins
1999 Prelude and Fugue, for oboe, bassoon, and piano
1999 Gershwiniana, for 3 violins (or 2 violins and viola)
2000 String Quartet No. 5
2001 Three Folksong Transformations, for violin, cello, and piano
2002 Spirituals, for clarinet and string quartet
2003-1997 Fantasy, Fugue, and Chaconne, for 2 cellos or viola and cello
2003 Five Greek Folksongs (after Ravel), for violin and piano
2007 Dialogues, for clarinet and piano
2009 Two Antiphonal Pieces, for cello and piano
2010 Norma's Variations, for violin and piano
2011 String Quartet No. 6
2011 Spirituals (Book II), for flute and cello

Vocal
1966 Three French Songs (Baudelaire and Verlaine), for high voice and piano
1967 After the Funeral (Thomas), for baritone and string trio
1974 Doria: Three Poems of Ezra Pound, for soprano and piano
1974 "My Papa's Waltz" and Other Songs (Williams, Moore, Plath, Roethke), for soprano and piano
1975 Black Hours: Five Sonnets of Gerard Manley Hopkins, for soprano and piano
1976 Two Lyrics of Gerard Manley Hopkins, for soprano and string trio
1978 Sestina: Altaforte (Pound), for baritone and piano
1978 Songs from "The Wild Swans at Coole" (Yeats), for high voice and piano
1982 Desert Places: Five Poems of Robert Frost, for high voice and piano
1984 Drum-Taps: Three Patriotic Poems (Frost, Whitman, Emerson), for soprano and piano
1985 Words for Music Perhaps (Yeats), for soprano and two violins
1986 Four Elegiac Songs (Hopkins, Yeats, Shakespeare, Dryden), for high voice and piano
1988 Six Songs of William Shakespeare, for medium voice and piano
2012 Five Shakespeare Songs, for voice and piano

Choral
1972 Dylan Thomas Settings
1972 Illumination (Rimbaud)
1973 Ceremony After a Fire Raid (Thomas)
1985 Four Choruses from Une Saison en Enfer (Rimbaud)
1985 Une Saison en Enfer (Rimbaud), for solo high baritone or tenor, chorus, and piano
2004 Sessions of Sweet Silent Thought (5 Sonnets of William Shakespeare)

Piano
1966 Two Toccatas
1970 Variations
1976 Voices
1982 Piano Fantasy: Homage to Copland (first movement of Piano Sonata)
1982 Piano Sonata
1985 Two Intermezzi
1989 Cocktail Music (Song Without Words)

Other solo
1967 Fantasy for violin
1971 Epithalamium for flute
1977 Fantasy
1978 High Wood for oboe
1987 Three Songs Without Words (arranged from Words for Music Perhaps) for violin
1991 Elegy on the Name "Dmitri Shostakovich" for viola (or cello) - dedicated to Elena Ozol
2005 Duet for Solo Clarinet
2013 Soliloquy for Solo Bassoon - composed for bassoonist Bryan Young

Articles
Interview with 21st Century Music: Food for Thought with Steven Gerber
Interview with Sequenza21
Essay on Orchestration, by Steven Gerber for New Music Box 
Keeping America Real: Essay on Steven Gerber by Robert Reilly

Recordings
Spirituals for String Orchestra; Clarinet Concerto; Serenade Concertante
St. Petersburg State Academic Symphony/Vladimir Lande, conductor
Jon Manasse, clarinet; Jose Miguel Cueto, violin; Natalia Malkova, violin
Arabesque CD Z6803

Symphony No. 1; Dirge and Awakening; Viola Concerto; Triple Overture
Russian Philharmonic Orchestra/Thomas Sanderling, conductor
Lars Anders Tomter, viola
The Bekova Sisters:
	Elvira Bekova, violin
	Alfia Bekova, cello
	Eleonora Bekova, piano
Chandos CD 9831

Violin Concerto; Cello Concerto; Serenade for String Orchestra
National Chamber Orchestra/Piotr Gajewski, conductor
Kurt Nikkanen, violin; Carter Brey, cello
KOCH International Classics  KIC-CD-7501

Fantasy; Three Songs Without Words
Curtis Macomber, violin
Composers Recordings, Inc.  CD 706

Une Saison en Enfer
The New Calliope Singers/Peter Schubert, conductor
William Parker, baritone; Steven R. Gerber, piano
Composers Recordings, Inc.  CD 638

Elegy on the Name "Dmitri Shostakovich"; Françoise Renard, viola
Suoni e Colori  SC 53006

Gershwiniana for three violins; 3 Folksong Transformations; 3 Pieces for two violins; Notturno for piano trio; Elegy on the Name Dmitri Shostakovich for viola; 3 Songs Without Words; Fantasy for violin; Duo for violin and cello; Piano Trio
Kurt Nikkanen, violin and viola; Cho-Liang Lin, violin; Cyrus Beroukhim, violin; Brinton Averil Smith, cello; Sara Davis Buechner, piano
Naxos 8.559618

References

External links
 StevenGerber.com - official web site with biography, discography, and audio samples
 Interview with Steven R. Gerber, March 23, 2003
 Steven Gerber composer page on publisher's website

20th-century classical composers
21st-century classical composers
American male classical composers
American classical composers
Musicians from Washington, D.C.
2015 deaths
1948 births
21st-century American composers
20th-century American composers
20th-century American male musicians
21st-century American male musicians